Marian Karel (born 21 August 1944 in Pardubice), is a Czech sculptor and university professor.

Life and career 
From 1959 to 1963 he studied at the Central School of Applied Arts in Jablonec nad Nisou. In the years 1965 to 1972 he studied at the studio of Stanislav Libenský at the Academy of Arts, Architecture and Design in Prague.

In 1992 he became Head of the Studio Glass in Architecture at the University of Applied Arts in Prague, and in 1995 he was appointed Professor and the Head of the department of fine arts. His other teaching activities have included posts in the United States, United Kingdom, Japan, New Zealand, Finland, France, Ireland and Bulgaria. Since 2009 he has been a professor at the Faculty of Architecture, Technical University, where he heads the Department of Industrial Design.

Art Work 

Marian Karel uses light, glass, and geometric forms to make illusionistic sculptures that challenge the viewer's perceptions of space. He has reached an international status within the Minimalistic movement, although he does not fully identify himself with this style. He expresses very simplistic interactions between basic geometrical elements, which very artfully and intricately connect and permeate. He has had several gallery and museum exhibitions, including at the Museum Kampa, The Jan and Meda Mládek Foundation and at the Galerie Karsten Greve, Paris. His works include the following sculptures:

 1988 - Glass sculpture in front of the Czech pavilion at the 43rd Venice Biennale
 1991 - The sculpture of polished granite, fused glass and steel, a sports complex, Chitose, Japan
 1992 - Spatial installation of metal and glass,  Czech pavilion at Seville Expo '92
 2002 - Museum Kampa, Prague: 3 sculptures from glass, steel, stone and wood
 2004 - Statue of astronomy professor Zdeněk Kopal in Litomyšl
 2006 - Statues of Prague at the Prague Congress Centre
 2010 - Gate of time and historiogram statue in the square of King George of Poděbrady in Cheb

References 

1944 births
Czech sculptors
Czech male sculptors
Modern sculptors
Living people
Academy of Arts, Architecture and Design in Prague alumni